The First Professional Football League, also known as the Bulgarian First League or Parva Liga, currently known as the efbet League for sponsorship reasons, is a professional association football league, located at the top of the Bulgarian football league system. Contested by 16 teams, it operates on a system of promotion and relegation with the Second Professional Football League.

The Bulgarian football championship was inaugurated in 1924 as the Bulgarian State Football Championship and has been played in a league format since 1948, when the A Group was established. The champions of the First League have the right to participate in the qualifying rounds of the UEFA Champions League based on the league's European coefficient. Additionally, two UEFA Europa League spots are allocated to the second team in the final standings and the winner of the European playoffs. A further fourth spot may also be granted to the fourth placed team in the final league ranking, given that the Bulgarian Cup holder has finished among the top three teams at the end of the season.

A total of 74 clubs have competed in the Bulgarian top-tier since its establishment. Since 1948, eleven different teams have been crowned champions of Bulgaria. The three most successful clubs are CSKA Sofia with 31 titles, Levski Sofia with 26 titles and Ludogorets Razgrad with 11 titles. The current champions Ludogorets Razgrad won their eleventh consecutive title in their eleventh First League season in 2021–22. Historically, the competition has been dominated by Sofia-based teams. Together they have won a total number of 70 titles.

History

Foundation

The first football championship in Bulgaria was held in 1924 as a knockout tournament. It was organised by the Bulgarian National Sports Federation (BNSF). The six inaugural teams were Vladislav Varna, Orel Vratsa, Levski Sofia, Krakra Pernik, Pobeda Plovdiv and Chernomorets Burgas, each having won and representing its regional sports federation, called sportna federatsiya. The championship was abandoned, because of a dispute between Vladislav and Levski over the replay of the final game. In the following 1925 season, SK Vladislav became the first champion of Bulgaria. The championship was reorganised for three seasons, from season 1937–38 to 1939–40, ten teams participated in a round-robin tournament, called the National Football Division.

A Republican Football Group
The inaugural season of the A Republican Football Group began in the autumn of 1948. The ten teams participating in the league were Levski, Septemvri, Lokomotiv, Slavia and Spartak from the capital city Sofia, and Botev Varna, Botev Burgas, Slavia Plovdiv, Marek Stanke Dimitrov, Benkovski in a spring-autumn cycle like in the Soviet Union. In the autumn of 1949, qualification tournaments were played to determine the teams that would play in the next 1950 season. In the next two seasons the number of teams in the league was increased to 12, and for the 1953 season there were 15 teams (the 16th team was the Bulgarian National Football Team). In seasons 1954 and 1955 there were 14 teams in the league, and in seasons 1956 and 1957 there were 10.

In 1958, the championship was again stopped after the spring half-season, as had happened in 1948. New re-organizations were accepted and the league was again going to be played in the autumn-spring format. Despite the fact that the teams had played just 1 match, CDNA was crowned as the champion of Bulgaria.

The frequent changes in the number of teams in A Group continued in the 1960s. In the first two seasons after the reforms in 1958, the number of teams in the league was 12, in the period 1960–1962 – 14, until season 1967/68, when the teams were 16.

There were new reforms at the end of the 1960s. There were many mergers between Bulgarian clubs. The most-famous are between CSKA Red Flag and Septemvri Sofia in CSKA September Flag, the capital teams Levski and Spartak in Levski-Spartak, Lokomotiv and Slavia in Slavia, the Plovdiv teams Botev, Spartak and Academic in Trakiya. Mergers happened between other Bulgarian clubs too. These mergers between clubs and reforms in A Group were made at the winter break of the 1968/69 season.

After the winter reforms in 1968 until 2000, A Group remained with 16 teams, except in seasons 1971/72 and 1972/73, when 18 teams competed in the league.

Premier Professional Football League
The Bulgarian Football Union decided to make reforms. The Premier Professional Football League, created in the autumn of 2000, had 14 teams participating in it. At the end of the 2000/01 season, the last two teams were directly relegated to the lower division and the team that finished 12th had the chance to compete in the promotion/relegation play-off for the remaining place in the league. Levski Sofia became champions in the first season of the Premier League.

In the 2001/02 season there was experimentation with the regulations. The championship was divided into two phases. In the first phase the teams played a regular season, each team playing twice against all the others, once home and once away. The second phase was a play-off phase.

In the following season, 2002/03, the championship returned to the regulations of 2000/01 – 14 teams playing in a home and away format. For the first time in 6 years, CSKA Sofia became champions.

A Group

The Bulgarian A Professional Football Group was created in 2003. The group was formed by 16 teams, each playing twice against all the others, once home and once away. In the first season of the newly created A Group, the 2003–04 season, for the first time in history, Lokomotiv Plovdiv became champions, finishing with 75 points. In 2004–05, CSKA Sofia won A Group for the 30th time.
For the next two seasons, Levski Sofia were champions under manager Stanimir Stoilov.  From 2005–06 the league's name has been A Football Group. In 2007–08, CSKA became champions of A Group for a record-breaking 31st time without a loss out of 30 matches. But in the summer, UEFA didn't give a licence for the club to play in the UEFA Champions League qualifying rounds and Levski Sofia entered to play in the tournament instead of CSKA. In the following season Levski Sofia won their last A Group title, finishing one point ahead of CSKA. Later on, two years in a row Litex Lovech won another two titles like in 1997–98 and 1998–99. In 2011–12, after winning promotion from B Group, Ludogorets Razgrad became the second team after Litex to win the A Group in their first season.

The Bulgarian Football Union made some changes in the format of A Group prior to season 2013–14 with the reduction of the number of the teams participating in the top league from 16 to 14 and the reintroduction of the two phase league with a regular season and a playoff/play out phase. For the 2014–15 season, the league was once more decreased, this time to 12 teams, keeping the two phase format. This season was memorable since two of the most popular and successful clubs, CSKA Sofia and Lokomotiv Sofia, were both excluded from the league, despite finishing in the top 5 places. Both teams had accumulated debts and did not have the financial resources to pay them, so the BFU decided to take away their professional licenses. This was the first time in the history of the A Group that CSKA was relegated. For the 2015–16 season, the BFU decided to further decrease the number of teams competing, this time to just 10, with a quadruple round robin format introduced, a format used in the Croatian First Football League and Albanian Kategoria Superiore.

First Professional Football League
On 7 June 2016 the league's name was changed to First Professional Football League, following approval of new licensing criteria for the clubs.

Competition format
Starting from the 2016–17 season, a new league format was approved by the Bulgarian Football Union, in an attempt to improve each participating club's competitiveness, match attendance and performance in the league. It involves 14 teams playing in two phases, a regular season and playoffs. The first phase includes each club competing against every other team twice in a double round-robin system, on a home-away basis at a total of 26 games per team and played in 26 fixtures. Seven matches are played in every fixture at a total of 182 games played during the first phase. In the second phase, the top six teams form a European qualifying table, while the bottom eight teams participate in a relegation group. The winner of the top group is declared as Champions of Bulgaria and is awarded with the title.

International qualification
The six top teams compete against each other on a home-away basis. Three matches are played in every fixture of the top six, with the results and points after the regular season also included. At the end of the stage, every team will have played a total of 36 games. The winner of the group is declared as Champions of Bulgaria and automatically secures participation in the 2017–18 UEFA Champions League second qualifying round. The team that ranks second is awarded with a place in the UEFA Europa League qualifying rounds. The third team in the final standings would participate in a play-off match against a representative team from the bottom eight. Depending on the winner of the Bulgarian Cup final, a possible fourth team from the first six may compete in a play-off match for an UEFA Europa League spot instead of the third ranked team.

Note: If the Bulgarian Cup winner has secured its qualification for the European tournaments for the next season through results from Parva Liga, then the place in the UEFA Europa League play-off is awarded to the fourth ranked team in the final standings.

Relegation
The teams in the bottom eight are split in two sub-groups of four teams, Group A and Group B, depending on their final position after the regular season standings. The teams that enter Group A are the 7th, 10th, 11th and the 14th, and the teams that participate in Group B are the 8th, 9th, 12th and the 13th. Every participant plays twice against the other three teams in their group on a home-away basis. The teams from the bottom eight also compete with the results from the regular season. After the group stages, every team will have played a total number of 32 games. Depending on their final position in Group A and Group B, two sections will be formed, one for a play-off spot in next season's European competitions and one to avoid relegation. The first two teams from each group continue in the semi-finals, and the last two teams of each group continue to the semi-finals for a relegation match. After this phase, one team is directly relegated to the Second League and the remaining two teams will compete in two relegation matches against the second and the third ranked clubs from the Second League.

Tiebreakers
In case of a tie on points between two or more clubs, tiebreakers are applied in the following order:

Number of wins;
Goal difference;
Goals for;
Goals against;
Fewest red cards;
Fewest yellow cards;
Draw

Current clubs
The following clubs are competing in the First League during the 2022–23 season.

List of champions

Performance by club

Bold indicates clubs which play in the 2022–23 First League.

Notes: 
 CSKA Sofia titles include those won as Septemvri pri CDNV, CDNA, and CFKA Sredets.
 Levski Sofia titles include those won as Levski-Spartak and Vitosha, as well as the re-awarded 1984–85 title.
 Botev Plovdiv total does not include 1984–85 title originally awarded to Trakia.

All-time ranking (since 1948)
The all-time Parva Liga table is an overall record of all match results, points and goals for each team that has participated in the league since its inception in 1948. It also shows every team's number of top three finishes, their best classification, debut season and current spell in Parva Liga, or the season they were last part of the championship.

Key

a. Never relegated.
b. Never relegated, withdrawn with political decision during the 1950 season, due to league reogranisation.
c. Club dissolved in 2006, successor clubs PSFC Chernomorets Burgas and FC Chernomorets 1919 Burgas were founded in 2005 and 2015.
d. Won the championship each season they've been in Parva Liga.
e. Club dissolved in 2003, successor clubs FC Etar 1924 Veliko Tarnovo and later SFC Etar Veliko Tarnovo were founded in 2002 and 2013.
f. Club dissolved in 2014 and refounded in 2018. successor club FC Shumen 1929 was founded 2013 and dissolved in 2016.
g. Club only supports a youth academy.
h. Club dissolved in 2012, successor clubs FC Lokomotiv 1929 Mezdra and OFC Lokomotiv Mezdra were founded in 2011 and 2012.

Bulgarian derbies

The Eternal Derby

The Eternal Derby of Bulgarian football is contested between the two most successful and most popular football clubs in Bulgaria, CSKA Sofia and Levski Sofia.

Plovdiv derby

The Plovdiv derby is contested between Botev and Lokomotiv.

Media coverage

For the start of the new 2012–13 season, the football clubs rejected requests from four TV stations due to the low payments being offered – Bulgarian National Television, Nova Television, TV7 and TV+. Finally after the first set of fixtures, the satellite broadcaster Bulsatcom with its channel TV+ bought the rights, along with BNT. Before the start of the spring half-season the rights were bought by TV7 and News7, who had rights for the first, third and fourth pick, and BNT 1 along with the international channel BNT World broadcasting the second pick of a match.

The next seasons will also be broadcast on the Nova Broadcasting Group channels Diema, Diema Sport and Diema Sport 2, part of the Diema Extra paid pack, as their contract with the league was additionally extended.

Sponsorship
Until 2011 the official sponsor of the championship was TBI Credit and the league was officially known as TBI A Football Group.

In 2011–12, A Group had a new sponsor, the Victoria FATA Insurance, and therefore the league name in that season was rebranded to Victoria A Football Championship.

In early 2013, for a short period of time the naming rights of A Group were bought from the news television network News7, eventually renaming the competition's name to NEWS7 Football Championship.

On 11 July 2019, the Bulgarian Football Union announced that the football division's name had been changed to efbet League, following a two-year sponsorship deal with a betting company of the same name.

Statistics

UEFA coefficients

The following data indicates Bulgarian coefficient rankings between European football leagues.

Country ranking
UEFA League Ranking as of 29 May 2021:

 22.  (22)  Eliteserien (21.000)
 23.  (21)  Allsvenskan (20.500)
 24.  (27)  First Professional Football League (20.375)
 25.  (28)  Liga I (18.200)
 26.  (26)  Azerbaijan Premier League (16.875)

Club ranking
UEFA 5-year Club Ranking as of 29 May 2021:
 57.  (60) Ludogorets Razgrad (28.000)
 137.  (256) CSKA Sofia (8.000)
 278.  (287) Lokomotiv Plovdiv (4.075)
 278.  (287) Slavia Sofia (4.075)
 278.  (284) Levski Sofia (4.075)
 278.  (287) Botev Plovdiv (4.075)
 278.  (287) Dunav Ruse (4.075)
 278.  (287) Beroe Stara Zagora (4.075)

Managers
The following is a table of all current Parva Liga head coaches and managers, and the time they've spent working with their respective clubs.

Records

All-time league appearances

All-time top scorers

Other records

Youngest player to appear in the league –  Radoslav Uzunov (aged 15 years and 1 month)
Oldest player to appear in the league –  Georgi Petkov (aged 45 years and 343 days)
Foreign player with the most appearances in the league –  Vančo Trajanov (328)
Foreign player with the most goals in the league –  Claudiu Keșerü (113)
Fastest goal scored in the league –  Miroslav Manolov (6 seconds)
Fastest red card in the league –  Nenad Filipović (20 seconds)
Tallest player to appear in the league –  Alessandro Coppola (2.05 m)

Top scorers by season

Bold indicates all-time highest.

See also

List of foreign football players in A PFG
Second Professional Football League (Bulgaria)

References

External links
 Official website
 League at UEFA
 Bulgaria – List of Champions, RSSSF.com
 Table, at xscores.com

 
1
Bul
Football
Professional sports leagues in Bulgaria